This was held on Saturday 8 and Sunday 9 July 2000, with 50,000 people attending. It was Travis' first appearance, as an unsigned band closed the Main Stage. It was All Saints' last Scottish appearance.

A week prior to the event an accident happened at Roskilde Festival where nine people died.  Following the incident security arrangements were reviewed while making sure the relevant safety procedures were in place to ensure a failsafe.

Line-up
The line up included:

Main stage

Stage 2

Slam Tent

King Tut's Tent

Incidents

See also
List of music festivals in the United Kingdom

References

2000 in Scotland
2000 in British music
T in the Park
July 2000 events in the United Kingdom
2000 music festivals